Live at Birdand by the Toshiko - Mariano Quartet is a jazz album made from recordings taken at the Birdland Club in New York City on two separate occasions in 1960 and 1961.  It was released on CD in 1991 by the European Fresh Sound label.

Track listing
 "Deep River" (traditional) – 4:44
 "Song of the Farm" (Akiyoshi) – 6:00
 "Blues for Father" (Akiyoshi, Mariano) – 8:30
 "When  You Meet Her" (Mariano) – 5:54
 "Elegy" (Akiyoshi) – 9:57
 "When Johnny Comes Marching Home" (traditional) – 7:41
 "Tempus Fugit" (Powell) – 5:32
 "Blues for Father" (Akiyoshi, Mariano) – 5:31

Personnel
Toshiko Akiyoshi – piano
Charlie Mariano – alto saxophone
Eddie Marshall – drums
Gene Cherico – bass

References / External Links

[ Allmusic]
Fresh Sound Records FSCD-1021 (1991) 
Studio Songs YZSO-10018 (2011) 

 

Toshiko Akiyoshi live albums
1961 live albums
Charlie Mariano albums
Albums recorded at Birdland